Guadalupe is a small city located in Santa Barbara County, California. According to the U.S. Census of 2010, the city has a population of 7,080. Guadalupe is economically and socially tied to the city of Santa Maria, which is about 8 miles (13 km) to the east. It is located at the intersection of Highway 1 and Highway 166, immediately south of the Santa Maria River, and 5 miles (8 km) east of the Pacific Ocean.

History
The first European land exploration of Alta California, the Spanish Portolá expedition, camped near today's Guadalupe on September 1, 1769. Franciscan missionary and expedition member Juan Crespí noted in his diary that they found "a very large lake". The lake has since mostly filled in, leaving a low-lying plain traversed by the Santa Maria River and several tributaries.

When Mission La Purisima was established in 1787, the area became part of the mission's pasture land. In 1840, following secularization of the mission, the area became part of the Rancho Guadalupe land grant. Rancho Guadalupe was settled by pioneers of many unique backgrounds, such as European, Chinese, Filipino, Japanese, and Mexican. The small town was incorporated as the city of Guadalupe on May 19, 1946. The city name honors Our Lady of Guadalupe, which is the Catholic title given to the Virgin Mary.

Geography
Guadalupe is located in the northwestern extremity of Santa Barbara County, immediately south of the Santa Maria River. The landscape in the vicinity of the town is mostly flat, with the predominant land use being agriculture and oil production.  Hills rise to the south of the town; on the other side of the hills is Vandenberg Space Force Base.  West of town, both in Santa Barbara County and north in adjacent San Luis Obispo County, is the Guadalupe-Nipomo Dunes, a large region of dune habitat along the Pacific Ocean shore.  Filmmakers have used this region as a setting for several films, including Cecil B. DeMille's 1923 Ten Commandments and in 1998 The Odd Couple II. Scenes from Pirates of the Caribbean: At World's End and Hidalgo have also been filmed here. The Guadalupe-Nipomo Dunes Center serves as the education and research facility for the natural area.

The town consists of a tight cluster of buildings, surrounded completely by agricultural land.

Climate
This region experiences mildly warm and dry summers, with no average monthly temperatures above 71.6 °F.  According to the Köppen Climate Classification system, Guadalupe has a warm-summer Mediterranean climate, abbreviated "Csb" on climate maps.

Demographics

2010
The 2010 United States Census reported that Guadalupe had a population of 7,080. The racial makeup of Guadalupe was 3,395 (48.0%) White, 74 (1.0%) African American, 103 (1.5%) Native American, 279 (3.9%) Asian, 5 (0.1%) Pacific Islander, 2,783 (39.3%) from other races, and 441 (6.2%) from two or more races. Hispanic or Latino of any race were 6,103 persons (86.2%).

The Census reported that 7,080 people (100% of the population) lived in households, 0 (0%) lived in non-institutionalized group quarters, and 0 (0%) were institutionalized.

There were 1,810 households, out of which 1,073 (59.3%) had children under the age of 18 living in them, 1,005 (55.5%) were opposite-sex married couples living together, 369 (20.4%) had a female householder with no husband present, 174 (9.6%) had a male householder with no wife present.  There were 143 (7.9%) unmarried opposite-sex partnerships, and 10 (0.6%) same-sex married couples or partnerships. 213 households (11.8%) were made up of individuals, and 93 (5.1%) had someone living alone who was 65 years of age or older. The average household size was 3.91.  There were 1,548 families (85.5% of all households); the average family size was 4.11.

The population was spread out, with 2,424 people (34.2%) under the age of 18, 797 people (11.3%) aged 18 to 24, 1,930 people (27.3%) aged 25 to 44, 1,362 people (19.2%) aged 45 to 64, and 567 people (8.0%) who were 65 years of age or older.  The median age was 28.2 years. For every 100 females, there were 101.3 males.  For every 100 females age 18 and over, there were 97.0 males.

The homeowner vacancy rate was 0.4%; the rental vacancy rate was 3.3%.  3,483 people (49.2% of the population) lived in owner-occupied housing units and 3,597 people (50.8%) lived in rental housing units.

2000
As of the census of 2000, there were 5,659 people, 1,414 households, and 1,217 families residing in the city. The racial makeup of the city was 45.54% White, 0.71% African American, 1.86% Native American, 5.88% Asian, 0.16% Pacific Islander, 38.70% from other races, and 7.16% from two or more races. Hispanic or Latino of any race were 84.48% of the population.

There were 1,414 households, out of which 53.8% had children under the age of 18 living with them, 62.8% were married couples living together, 16.9% had a female householder with no husband present, and 13.9% were non-families. 11.2% of all households were made up of individuals, and 6.2% had someone living alone who was 65 years of age or older.  The average household size was 4.00 and the average family size was 4.24.

In the city, the population was spread out, with 35.6% under the age of 18, 11.7% from 18 to 24, 28.9% from 25 to 44, 15.2% from 45 to 64, and 8.5% who were 65 years of age or older.  The median age was 27 years. For every 100 females, there were 104.1 males.  For every 100 females age 18 and over, there were 101.4 males.

The median income for a household in the city was $31,205, and the median income for a family was $31,042. Males had a median income of $24,250 versus $17,870 for females. The per capita income for the city was $11,608.  About 23.4% of families and 25.0% of the population were below the poverty line, including 28.9% of those under age 18 and 15.7% of those age 65 or over.

Economy

Agriculture is by far the leading industry in Guadalupe. The most common employment sector is agriculture. It has the highest percentage of agricultural- and manufacturing workers in Santa Barbara County: 31% are employed in the agriculture sector, while 24% have manufacturing jobs. Apio Inc. and Obispo Cooling take produce in from the surrounding fields and prepare it for shipping to points across the nation as well as overseas.

The majority of the small businesses in town can be found on Guadalupe Street. Restaurants include El Tapatio, Guadalupe Cafe, Two Guys Pizza, King Falafel, Charlie's Place, Panda Stick, and Papa Jay's Southern Quezine. For half a century, the city was home to the famous Far Western Tavern (formerly the Palace Hotel), until it relocated to Old Town Orcutt in 2012, following the death of founder and philanthropist Clarence Minetti. The Far Western building has since been donated to the Guadalupe-Nipomo Dunes Center, who are currently managing a renovation of the building, which will become the new home of the Dunes Center. It was placed on the state's Register of Historic Resources in 2019.

Groceries can be bought at La Chiquita Market and at the historic Masatani's Market, which has been owned and operated by the Masatani family since 1922. Hardware can be purchased at the Guadalupe Hardware Company. Cars can be serviced at NAPA Auto Parts, two tire shops, an auto body shop, and three auto mechanic shops in town. There is also a public library on Main Street, a dentist and a panaderia (a bakery that serves Mexican pastries and sweet bread), La Roca. There is a pharmacy and a medical clinic behind the post office. There are two laundromats in town and a recycling center in the Roy's Liquor parking lot. There are three gas stations in the town: the Chevron on Guadalupe Street and 11th Street, the YK Market on Guadalupe Street, and the Eagle Energy diesel/gas station on Obispo Street and 4th Street.

An ongoing construction development along the south side of town will add more than 800 homes. The project, Pasadera Homes, was first announced in 1993 and has undergone several delays. The city annexed the 209-acre site in 1995. When completed, it is expected to boost the city's population — now slightly more than 7,000 — to the 10,000 that is considered the threshold for attracting chain stores and restaurants. In addition to homes, the plan includes a new school and commercial development.

The city faced economic troubles in the late 2000s and early 2010s; in 2015, a grand jury urged the city to dissolve. Voters overwhelmingly approved the passage of three new tax and fee measures, which, along with the aforementioned residential and commercial developments, helped stabilize the city's economy.

Arts and culture

Guadalupe is a small town with a diverse culture and history. In addition to the Dunes Center, the town contains an art museum, the Rancho de Guadalupe Historical Society, a public library, veteran's memorial, and the Masatani Mansion. Nuestra Señora De Guadalupe is the main Catholic church, located on 11th Street and Obispo Street. There are three other Christian churches in town, as well as an old Buddhist temple. The historic building occupied by city hall and the police department used to be an elementary school. There is a very small historic jail building at the park near the train tracks where the water tower stands. Every year on September 16, there is a parade on Guadalupe Street to celebrate Mexico's independence from Spain.

Guadalupe is also home to the historic Royal Theater, which was a single-screen 510-seat movie theater, located on Highway 1. Built in 1939, the Royal was originally owned and managed by Japanese-American businessmen Arthur Fukuda, Jack Takeuchi, and Kiyozo Noji, who were relocated to internment camps in 1942. The theater was then operated under a number of owners until its closure and acquisition by the city in the 1990s. Since then, there have been several plans to refurbish the building in an effort to revitalize the downtown area. Currently, the city plans to repurpose the building as a community arts center, and to have the site registered as an historic landmark.

In 1993 the town was featured in California's Gold episode 401, "Buried Treasure". The episode centered around the set of The Ten Commandments buried underneath the Guadalupe Dunes.

Former President and then-Republican Party nominee George W. Bush and his wife Laura paid visit to Guadalupe, eating at La Simpatia restaurant as part of a two-day campaign trip during the 2000 election.

Parks and recreation

There is a beach near Guadalupe at the end of Main Street that is part of the Guadalupe-Nipomo Dunes. Oso Flaco Lake in Nipomo is also a part of this dunes complex and is a few miles north of Guadalupe; it features a boardwalk that goes over the lake and leads to the Guadalupe beach.

South of Guadalupe on Highway 1 and right on Brown Road is Point Sal Road, which was closed down due to heavy storms in the past years, but it has now become a scenic hiking trail through the coastal mountains. At the end of the 5 mile trail, which passes through Vandenberg Space Force Base, is the isolated Point Sal State Beach. Between Guadalupe Beach and Point Sal Beach is the even more isolated Paradise Beach, near Mussel Rock.

Parks in the area include Jack O'Connell Park, where the Bulldogs youth football team practices. LeRoy Park, the community center for the city and the home of the local Boys & Girls Club, sits near the town's northern city limit, and is the oldest community park in Santa Barbara County; the land was donated in 1871 by the LeRoy family, and the park is currently undergoing a major revitalization project.

The Guadalupe Wrestling Club was established in 1979 for the youth and has produced numerous state champions over the years. The Guadalupe Police Department runs the Gladiator's club, which provides peer-to-peer mentoring for fifth and sixth grade youth. The Boys & Girls Club and the Riverview apartment tutoring program provide places for children to go after school.

Education
The Guadalupe Union School District operates two schools: Mary Buren Elementary and Kermit McKenzie Junior High School. In state rankings, the two schools are in the 20th percentile. Mary Buren Elementary is kindergarten to fifth grade and McKenzie Junior High is sixth grade to eighth grade.  The mascot of both schools is the bobcat. There is also a preschool run by the Community Action Commission of Santa Barbara County.

As of 2021, Maria Gonzalez is the principal of Mary Buren Elementary, and Alexander Jáuregui is the principal at McKenzie Junior High. Emilio Handall is the current superintendent of the Guadalupe Union School District.

Transportation
Guadalupe is at the intersection of California State Route 1 and 166, providing easy access to cities north, east, and south, the largest of which is nearby Santa Maria. Amtrak runs through town, and the Guadalupe station is on the Pacific Surfliner route. There is a large pedestrian bridge in the residential area, which gives an easy way for people to cross the tracks which split the town just east of Highway 1.

The Guadalupe Flyer bus runs routes to Santa Maria hourly.

References

External links
 

Official Website of the City of Guadalupe California Portal style website, Government, Business, Library, Recreation and more
City-Data.com Comprehensive Statistical Data and more about Guadalupe
Official website of the Guadalupe Dunes County Park (also called Rancho Guadalupe Dunes)

Incorporated cities and towns in California
Cities in Santa Barbara County, California